Igor (stylized in all caps) is the fifth studio album by American rapper and producer Tyler, the Creator. It was released on May 17, 2019, through Columbia Records. Produced solely by Tyler, the album features guest appearances from Playboi Carti, Lil Uzi Vert, Solange, Kanye West, and Jerrod Carmichael. Following the release of Flower Boy (2017), the album was primarily recorded in California, with recording sessions also being held in Lake Como, Italy, and Atlanta between 2017 and 2019.

Music journalists have noted that Igor continues to build on the hip hop and neo soul sound established in Flower Boy, while also incorporating R&B and funk influences. Critics have noted the album's use of synthesizers and low-mixed vocals. Thematically, Igor follows a narrative of a love triangle between the titular character and his male love interest. The album employs the "Igor" literary archetype to explore themes associated with love, such as heartbreak, loss, and jealousy.

To help market the album, Tyler, the Creator released the single "Earfquake", which reached number 13 on the US Billboard Hot 100, becoming his highest-charting single. In its first week of release, Igor debuted at number one on the US Billboard 200, moving 165,000 album-equivalent units and becoming Tyler, the Creator's first US number-one album. It was a widespread critical success, being named among the best albums of 2019 in many publications' year-end lists, and won Best Rap Album at the 2020 Grammy Awards.

Background and recording 
Work on the album began in 2017, with Tyler initially writing the song "Earfquake" for Canadian singer Justin Bieber and Barbadian singer Rihanna, who both turned down the song. The song "I Think" was recorded in Lake Como, Italy with the help of American singer Solange. Tyler wrote "Running Out of Time" while taking a break from a recording session with American rapper ASAP Ferg, feeling reassured after Kendrick Lamar told Tyler he appreciated his singing. Tyler produced the beat for "Gone, Gone" in 2013 while on tour for his second studio album Wolf, choosing to scrap the song from both Cherry Bomb and Flower Boy since he didn't feel it fit either of those albums.

In an interview with Fantastic Man for their Autumn and Winter 2018 issue, Tyler was asked if he had ever been in love, to which he replied: "I don't want to talk about that. Um, that's the next record." In October 2018, Tyler previewed the song "Running Out of Time" for an interview with Fast Company.

On April 26, 2019, a supplemental financial report from Sony revealed that a new album from Tyler was expected by the end of June. In early May 2019, Tyler released snippets for the tracks "Igor's Theme" and "What's Good". The album was first announced by Tyler through his social media accounts on May 6, 2019.

Composition 
Rolling Stone writer Danny Schwartz described Igor as a "rich and messy mélange of R&B, funk and rap". The album is synth-heavy, with neo soul melodies and low-mixed vocals.

Themes and narrative 
The album follows a narrative of a love triangle where Tyler is in love with a man who is also dating a woman who is pulling him away from Tyler. American comedian Jerrod Carmichael serves as the album's narrator as it progresses, speaking short lines to make sense of Tyler's and the title character Igor's state of mind. Carmichael first appears on the album's fourth track "Exactly What You Run from You End Up Chasing".

The character Igor is mentioned by name on the tracks "Igor's Theme" and "What's Good". Igor follows the Gothic "Igor" archetype as a villain's assistant and represents a darker, apathetic side of Tyler that is revealed. Igor arrives after Tyler pours out all of his heart for his love interest, though his love interest remains focused on his ex-girlfriend. The arrival of Igor serves as a reset for the strong romantic emotions Tyler was entangled in during the album's first half.

Promotion 

A music video for the song, "Earfquake", was released alongside the album's release on May 17, 2019. It was sent to rhythmic contemporary radio on June 4, 2019, as the album's lead single in the United States. On June 3, 2019, Tyler announced his forthcoming tour for the album, which was supported by Jaden Smith, Blood Orange, and GoldLink.

Video album
On August 14, 2019, Apple Music released the video album Apple Music Presents: Tyler, the Creator. The album is a collection of eleven videos recorded from Tyler's first live performance of Igor, performed in May 2019.

Critical reception 

Igor was met with widespread critical acclaim. At Metacritic, which assigns a normalized rating out of 100 to reviews from professional publications, the album received an average score of 81, based on 18 reviews. Aggregator AnyDecentMusic? gave it 7.9 out of 10, based on their assessment of the critical consensus.

Roisin O'Connor of The Independent gave a positive review, stating "The production here is superb. Tyler has never been one for traditional song structure, but on IGOR he's like the Minotaur luring you through a maze that twists and turns around seemingly impossible corners, drawing you into the thrilling unknown. ... This is Tyler's best work to date". Andy Kellman of AllMusic said, "Tyler and a motorcade's worth of supporting vocalists fulfill the promise and threat with what plays out, a creatively vital and emotionally heartsick set with as much pain, vulnerability, and compulsion as a classic soul LP". Danial Spielberger of HipHopDX saying "On IGOR, Tyler showcases a more polished iteration of the hazy pop he's been perfecting for years. Though some might be disappointed that he's becoming more of a singer than a rapper, this is the kind of project that should encourage more artists to disavow labels and relish in taking risks". Rolling Stone critic Danny Schwartz said, "Igor is a heartfelt album that finds Tyler lowering his guard and revealing himself to be a shape-shifting artist who is still growing, and who has fully shed his skin as a vulgar internet cowboy". Sam Moore of NME stated: "IGOR is an accomplished and evergreen record that's well worth putting your phone down, turning the TV off and devoting your full attention span to." Clashs Nick Rosebade wrote, "The trademark visceral beats, scathing lyrics and the general feeling of anger and aggression that peppered his previous albums have been replaced with slower beats and irresistible soul hooks. At first this change in tone, and pace, is jarring and you are waiting for it to kick off, but as the album progresses you get into it and dig this new Tyler".

Reviewing the album for Sputnikmusic, Rowan5215 stated: "IGOR is not by any means Tyler's best work, and at times deliberately plays against his strengths in order to keep the listener off-guard—this pays dividends in the stunning "I THINK" and "A BOY IS A GUN", less so on the repetitive and cloying "RUNNING OUT OF TIME" and "ARE WE STILL FRIENDS?". What it is, though, is a form of ragged beat-tape minimalist that Tyler wears extremely well." In a mixed review, The Guardians Dean Van Nguyen stated: "It's no bad thing that Igor downplays Tyler's indomitable personality – but the writing and execution do not quite replace what has been lost. What's left is a fine showcase of ingenuity that too rarely burrows very far into your consciousness."

Year-end lists

Industry awards

Controversy 
Despite winning Best Rap Album at the 2020 Grammy Awards, Tyler has affirmed that Igor should be considered a pop album, and criticized the Grammys' choice to place him in the Rap and Urban categories as being racially motivated and a "backhanded compliment".

Commercial performance 
Igor debuted at number one on the US Billboard 200 with 165,000 album-equivalent units, of which 74,000 were pure album sales. It is Tyler's first US number-one album.

Track listing 
All tracks written and produced by Tyler, the Creator (Tyler Okonma), except where noted.

Notes

 All tracks are stylized in all caps. For example, "Igor's Theme" is stylized as "IGOR'S THEME".
 "A Boy Is a Gun" often has its title stylized with an asterisk at the end.

Samples
 "Igor's Theme" incorporates uncredited elements of "Attention", performed by Head West; and "Scatin', performed by Dâm-Funk.
  "I Think" incorporates elements of "Get Down", written and composed by Bodiono Nkono Télesphore, and performed by Nkono Teles; and "Special Lady", written and performed by Bibi Mascel.
 "Running Out of Time" contains samples of "Hit It Run", performed by Run-DMC.
 "New Magic Wand" incorporates elements of "Vsichni Praznj", written and performed by Siluetes 61.
  "A Boy Is a Gun" contains excerpts from "Bound", written by Bobby Dukes, Bobby Massey, and Lester Allen McKenzie, and performed by Ponderosa Twins Plus One.
  "Puppet" incorporates elements of "Today", written by Mick Ware and performed by Czar; and contains excerpts from "It's Alright With Me", written by David Smith and performed by Part Time.
  "Gone, Gone / Thank You" contains excerpts from "Hey Girl", written and performed by Cullen Omori; and interpolations from "Fragile", written by Alan O'Day and Tatsuro Yamashita, and performed by Yamashita.
  "Are We Still Friends?" contains excerpts from "Dream", written and performed by Al Green.
  "Boyfriend" contains excerpts from "Fluid", written by John Charles Alder and performed by Twink.

Personnel 
Credits adapted from Tidal and liner notes.

Musicians
 
 Tyler Okonma – lead vocals, production, arrangement
 Lil Uzi Vert – vocals (track 1)
 Playboi Carti – rap verse (track 2)
 Solange – vocals (track 3), background vocals (tracks 7, 11)
 Jerrod Carmichael – vocals (track 4), additional vocals (tracks 6, 8–10, "Boyfriend")
 Kanye West – rap verse (track 8)
 Anthony Evans – background vocals (tracks 1, 3, 10)
 Amanda Brown – background vocals (tracks 1, 3, 10)
 Tiffany Stevenson – background vocals (tracks 1, 3, 10)
 Charlie Wilson – background vocals (tracks 2, 11, "Boyfriend")
 Jessy Wilson – background vocals (tracks 2, 5, 6, 8, 10, 11)
 Ryan Beatty – background vocals (track 3)
 Santigold – background vocals (tracks 4, 6, 8, "Boyfriend")
 CeeLo Green – background vocals (track 10)
 La Roux – background vocals (track 10)
 Pharrell Williams – background vocals (track 12)
 Slowthai – additional vocals (track 9)
 Kevin Kendricks – keyboards (track 3), additional keyboards (track 7), chimes (track 8)
 Jack White

Technical
 
 Vic Wainstein – recording (tracks 1–3, 5–12)
 Tyler Okonma – recording (tracks 1–3, 5–9, 11)
 Kingston Callaway – recording (track 10)
 John Armstrong – recording assistance (track 1)
 Ben Fletcher – recording assistance (track 1)
 Rob Bisel – recording assistance (tracks 1, 3, 9)
 Ashley Jacobson – recording assistance (track 2)
 Thomas Cullison – recording assistance (tracks 2, 10)
 Josh Sellers – recording assistance (tracks 5, 6)
 Derrick Jenner – recording assistance (track 7)
 Neal H Pogue – mixing
 Zachary Acosta – mix assistance
 MeMiceElfani – mix assistance
 Mike Bozzi – mastering

Charts

Weekly charts

Year-end charts

Certifications

Notes

References 

2019 albums
Albums produced by Tyler, the Creator
Odd Future Records albums
Tyler, the Creator albums
Columbia Records albums
Albums recorded at Shangri-La (recording studio)
Grammy Award for Best Rap Album
Song cycles
Concept albums
Hip hop albums by American artists
Neo soul albums
Contemporary R&B albums by American artists
Funk albums by American artists